Tropidophorus boehmei, also known commonly as Boehme's water skink, is a species of lizard in the family Scincidae. The species is native to Vietnam.

Etymology
The specific name, boehmei, is in honor of German herpetologist Wolfgang Böhme.

Geographic range
T. boehmei is endemic to Lào Cai Province in northern Vietnam.

Habitat

Description
Dorsally, it is dark gray, with a pattern of lighter crossbands and white dots.

Diet
T. boehmi preys upon spiders.

Reproduction
The mode of reproduction of T. boehmi is unknown.

References

Further reading
Nguyen TQ, Nguyen TT, Schmitz A, Orlov NL, Zeigler T (2010). "A new species of the genus Tropidophorus Duméril & Bibron, 1839 (Squamata: Sauria: Scincidae) from Vietnam". Zootaxa 2439: 53–68. (Tropidophorus boehmei, new species).

boehmei
Reptiles of Vietnam
Endemic fauna of Vietnam
Reptiles described in 2010
Taxa named by Truong Quang Nguyen
Taxa named by Nikolai Loutseranovitch Orlov
Taxa named by Andreas Schmitz
Taxa named by Thomas Ziegler (zoologist)